Hakea sericea, commonly known as bushy needlewood or silky hakea, is a large shrub with a profusion of mainly white flowers from July for several months. It is endemic to eastern Australia. It has become an environmental weed in some countries.

Description
The branchlets are densely covered in grey-whitish short, soft, woolly hairs. The inflorescence appear in umbels  of 1–6 flowers in leaf axils, pinkish in bud and maturing to white. The leaves are moderately covered with flattened silky hairs, quickly becoming smooth. 

Taxonomy and naming
Hakea sericea was first formally described by Heinrich Schrader and Johann Christoph Wendland in 1797 and published the description in Sertum Hannoveranum.  The genus Hakea is named after Baron von Hake, patron of botany in the 18th century. Sericea meaning silky, referring to the tiny hairs on young growth.

Distribution and habitat
Silky hakea is found from the coast and adjacent ranges of south-eastern Queensland to south-eastern New South Wales. A frost tolerant species, grows in well-drained soil and full sun. A good habitat plant due to its prickly habit and winter flowering. It is also naturalised in Victoria and possibly South Australia.

H. sericea is an invasive weed in some areas outside Australia, specifically in South Africa, New Zealand and Portugal.

References

sericea
Endemic flora of Australia
Flora of New South Wales
Flora of Victoria (Australia)
Garden plants of Australia
Plants described in 1797